La Cadière-d'Azur is a commune in the Var department in the Provence-Alpes-Côte d'Azur region in southeastern France.

It is situated north-west of Toulon next to Le Castellet and Saint-Cyr-sur-Mer.

History
La Cadière-d'Azur was first recorded in 993.
The village was a Seigneurie of the Viscounts of Marseille, and later of the Abbey of St-Victor.
There has also been evidence of Roman dwelling in the village with quite a few Gallo-Roman vestiges being discovered in the region, including several Roman fountains.

Population

The village
The village is on a hilltop that overlooks a lot of the Bandol vineyards.

The village still has 3 remaining medieval Gate Doors, which are the Porte St-Jean (built-in January 1561), Porte de la Colle, and the Porte Mazarine, in the ancient medieval walls. Two other older medieval buildings of the village are the Tour de l'Horloge with a 16th-century campanile and the 16th-century St-André church which features a tall hexagonal clock tower.

The village has a museum of the local area, a post office, a cemetery, and several shops and cafes.

Wine
La Cadière-d'Azur is surrounded by vineyards and is part of the Côtes de Provence Appellation d'Origine Contrôlée (AOC) of Bandol.

See also
Communes of the Var department

References

External links
 La Cadiere-d'Azur tourist office

Communes of Var (department)